The 2008 Malta International Football Tournament was the fourteenth and last edition of the Malta International Tournament, a biannual football competition organised by the Malta Football Association for a select men's national football team. It was held in Malta, from 2 February to 6 February 2008, with games played at the National Stadium in Ta' Qali.

Besides Malta's national team, Armenia, Belarus and Iceland contested this edition.

Matches

Winner

Statistics

Goalscorers

See also 
 China Cup
 Cyprus International Football Tournament

References 

2008
2007–08 in Maltese football
2008 in Icelandic football
2008 in Armenian football
2008 in Belarusian football